Ralph Joseph Perk (January 19, 1914 – April 21, 1999) was an American politician of the Republican Party who served as the 52nd mayor of Cleveland, Ohio.

Early life
Born to an ethnic Czech American family in Cleveland, Perk dropped out of high school at 15 and later took correspondence courses to earn his high-school diploma. He studied history, political science and mathematics at the Cleveland College of Case Western Reserve University and St. John's College in Cleveland. During the Great Depression he worked as a patternmaker, then worked with his brother George in running the Perk Coal and Ice Company. He went on to work in real estate, but returned to patternmaking during World War II to aid in the war effort, after the military rejected him due to earlier health problems resulting from kidney stones. Perk then moved into politics, becoming a precinct committeeman for Cleveland's Republican Party in 1940 and then assuming the leadership of the Southeast Air Pollution Committee tasked with fighting industrial pollution in the Flats.

Political career
Beginning in 1953, Perk was elected to five two-year terms on Cleveland City Council from the city's Ward 13, representing his native Broadway–Slavic Village neighborhood. During his service on Council, Perk founded the American Nationalities Movement, an umbrella agency for 35 nationality groups. In 1962, he was elected auditor of Cuyahoga County, the first Republican to win countywide office since the mid-1930s; he was re-elected in 1966 and 1970. In 1965 and 1969, Perk ran for mayor of Cleveland and was defeated both times in the general election. In 1971, Perk won the Republican nomination for mayor for the third time. He defeated future mayor, governor, and U.S. Senator George Voinovich, then a member of the Ohio House of Representatives, in the primary. Perk went on to win the general election, "propelled into office by a heavy ethnic [Eastern European] vote." He became the first Republican to serve as mayor of Cleveland since the 1940s, and proceeded to make future mayoral elections nonpartisan. He was reelected in 1973 and 1975.

Mayoralty

As mayor, Perk benefited from his good connections with President Richard Nixon, allowing Cleveland to obtain federal funds to aid neighborhoods and to help crack down on city crime in the era of Irish American mobster Danny Greene. He also greatly expanded Cleveland's international ties by initiating several sister city partnerships.

It was Perk who also recommended that the Cleveland Division of Police move to the Justice Center after years of battles between Cuyahoga County and the City of Cleveland. Had the CAIA been built, CAIA would have rivaled New York's JFK International Airport, or Chicago's O'Hare International and made Cleveland Hopkins International Airport akin to Chicago's Midway Airport. The plan was opposed by environmentalists, who petitioned the federal government to create the Cuyahoga Valley National Park in 1974. In 1974, Mayor Perk also proposed merging the CTS-or Cleveland Transit System with suburban transit systems. In 1975, voters passed a 1% sales tax to create the Greater Cleveland Regional Transit Authority, know locally as RTA.

In 1972, three years after the Cuyahoga River fire and Mayor Stokes's efforts to clean it up, Perk formed the NEORSD-or the Northeast Ohio Regional Sewer District. In December 1970 a federal grand jury investigation led by U.S. Attorney Robert Jones, the first grand jury investigation of water pollution in the area, led to Jones filing multiple lawsuits against the polluters (about 12 companies in Northeast Ohio). After leaving the U.S. Attorney's office for an unsuccessful run for County Prosecutor in 1972, Jones was brought in to the Cleveland Legal Department to assist with NEORSD matters.

In 1974, Perk won the Republican nomination for the United States Senate seat formerly held by William B. Saxbe, who had resigned to accept the appointment to the office of United States Attorney General. Perk, however, was defeated soundly by Democrat John Herschel Glenn, Jr. Perk had stated that he was counting on running against the incumbent senator, Howard M. Metzenbaum, who had been recently appointed to the seat by then Governor John J. Gilligan. Metzenbaum lost the primary to Glenn.  Subsequently, in 1977, Perk suffered an upset defeat in the non-partisan primary for mayor, finishing third behind Dennis Kucinich, a former political ally, and Edward F. Feighan. Kucinich prevailed over Feighan in the general election, setting the stage for his subsequent mayoralty.

Gaffes
As mayor, Perk was also known for his many political gaffes. On October 16, 1972, he accidentally set his hair on fire when he attempted to use a welder's torch for a ribbon-cutting ceremony for the American Society for Metals at the Cleveland Convention Center. A spark from the torch had "hit his head and his hair caught fire thanks to a product that a barber put in it earlier in the day." The mayor later jested, "There are more hazards to this job than I expected." For this, the media proclaimed Perk to be the "hottest mayor in the country" and even Cleveland native Bob Hope joked about the incident.

In another incident, Perk's wife, Lucille, famously rejected an invitation from First Lady Pat Nixon to an event at the White House in order to attend her regular bowling night. Later, Perk explained his wife's comment to mean that she was unable to attend because the invitation had come too late and she was unable to prepare for travel. Perk was rumored to say, "tell them it's your bowling night." Though the remark brought howls of laughter throughout the city, it endeared the Perks to their ethnic Eastern European voter base. In yet another gaffe, Perk suggested that a study on pornography ought to be conducted by municipal sanitation workers.

Controversy

Perk also appointed Richard Eberling in 1973 to chair a committee to redecorate the mayor's office in City Hall, a move that proved unpopular with numerous sources. In 1974, The Plain Dealer exposed Eberling's record as a petty criminal in a front-page story; Perk defended Eberling, and approved the financing of project until the amount significantly over-reached the budgeted amount. Eberling's lover, Obie Henderson was hired as Perk's personal secretary.  Eberling was later found guilty in the death of Ethel M. Durkin, a Cleveland area widow; he also linked himself to the Marilyn Sheppard murder in Bay Village, in 1954. Circumstantial evidence also links Eberling to at least four other murders committed over a period from 1946 to 1970 that involved his stepfather, his purported girlfriend, and both of Mrs. Durkin's sisters.

Personal life
Perk and his wife had six sons and a daughter. His son, Ralph J. Perk, Jr., served as a municipal court judge in Cleveland from  1989 to 2003. Another son, Thomas Perk, is a council member in the village of Valley View in addition to being a fire fighter. Yet another son, Kenneth Perk, is a member of the Cuyahoga Heights Board of Education. His second-youngest son, Allen G. Perk, is the President and CEO of XLNsystems Inc. in Columbus, Ohio.

Perk was diagnosed with prostate cancer in the 1990s, and underwent treatments for the disease. The treatment was thought to have been successful, but in early 1998 Perk and his family learned that the cancer had not only returned but had spread. Perk's children spent a year caring for their father at home. Five days before his death, Perk was admitted to the Corinthian Skilled Nursing Center in Westlake, Ohio. He died there on April 21, 1999. He was buried at Holy Cross Cemetery in Brook Park, Ohio.

References

External links
 The Life & Times of Ralph J. Perk, Cleveland Memory Project (Cleveland State University)

1914 births
1999 deaths
Mayors of Cleveland
American people of Czech descent
Republican Party members of the Ohio House of Representatives
Cleveland City Council members
20th-century American politicians